Julian Richer  (born 1959) is an English retail entrepreneur, philanthropist and author, best known as the founder and managing director of Richer Sounds, the UK's largest hi-fi retailer. Richer has gained a reputation for his motivational style of management and his philanthropic and charitable activities.

According to the Sunday Times Rich List in 2019, Richer is worth £160 million.

Early life
Richer was born in St Thomas' Hospital, London, in 1959. He was at UCS Junior School from 1968 to 1972 before becoming a boarder at Clifton College in Bristol between 1972 and 1977, thanks to a bequest from his grandfather.
His parents both worked for Marks & Spencer before going on to work for themselves. His father, Percy, later qualified as a solicitor when he was 50.

Career
Richer's business career started at the age of 14 while he was still at school at Clifton College, Bristol, and he opened his first shop near London Bridge aged 19. This store in south London holds the Guinness record for the highest sales per square foot of any retail outlet in the world.

Richer in the past advised some organisations including Asda on staff motivation, customer service, cultural change, communications and suggestion schemes.  In March 2018 Marks & Spencer announced that he was advising them on cultural change.

He was made the youngest ever Business Communicator of the Year for 1995.

He has been awarded honorary doctorates by Kingston University, Bournemouth University in 2002, and York University in 2013.

Richer was appointed as a Lieutenant of the Royal Victorian Order (LVO) in 2007.

In November 2013, Richer announced to the press that he would bequeath 100% of the firm to a trust co-owned by employees of the company. In May 2019 Richer, then aged 60, announced that he had transferred ownership to employees by passing 60% of his shares to a trust, as well as separately paying each employee, excluding directors, a thank you bonus of £1,000 for every year of work from his own pocket to his 500+ employees who had worked an average of 8 years each (circa £4 million).

In 2019, Richer was awarded the 'Outstanding Contribution to Retail' award by Retail Week magazine.

In 2020, What Hi-Fi?, the world’s #1 tech buyer’s guide, gave Richer their Outstanding Contribution award, stating “The man behind Richer Sounds, and much more, has made an undeniably positive mark on the UK hi-fi industry.” 

In 2022, Richer wrote a series of 31 articles for The Sunday Times in the business section, under the title "Julian Richer's Sound Advice".

Charitable interests
15% of the profits from Richer Sounds are donated to charities.

Richer has a particular interest in supporting charities involved with human rights, animal welfare, social housing deprivation and fighting injustice.

Richer founded ACTS435, which was launched in December 2009 by the Archbishop of York, Dr John Sentamu, who remains a patron.
Acts435 connects people in need with people who can donate.  ACTS435 operates from some 600 locations, mostly churches but also Citizens Advice branches and debt counselling centres. Christians Against Poverty and The Trussell Trust are key partners. Some thirty thousand people have benefited from the charity (as of May 2021). The charity allows people to give directly to those in need. This means that 100% of funds raised by Acts435 goes to the recipients.

He founded the charity ASB Help in autumn 2013 which supports victims of anti-social behaviour. Baroness Newlove, Victims’ Commissioner, endorsed ASB Help soon after, commenting “I am delighted that ASB Help has launched this service to help equip victims in the fight against anti-social behaviour." The charity’s website provides interactive guides, practical information and the necessary tools on how to effectively report anti-social behaviour. it helps in between two and five thousand people per week.

He founded Richer Unsigned, a not-for-profit designed to promote the best undiscovered music the UK has to offer. Richer Unsigned supports and promotes musicians who may just be getting started, who have been in the industry a while or simply don't have a great label deal. It currently has over 3,000 artists featured on its website.

In 2018 he founded TaxWatch which launched in October, dedicated to the research and exposure of aggressive tax avoiding corporations. TaxWatch has been cited by several newspapers, including The Times, The Financial Times, The Guardian, The Daily Telegraph and many others as well as Parliament with regard to corporate tax avoidance, including high profile investigations into tech, media and retail companies. It was also included in International Tax Review’s 2020-2021 Global Tax 50. International Tax Review’s Global Tax 50 is an annual list of “the most influential figures and events in fiscal policy over the past year.” The list also seeks to recognise “who and what will be particularly important” in the coming year. In their article about TaxWatch ITR noted, “TaxWatch has existed for just over two years but, in that time, it has made a big name for itself.” 

In November 2019 it was reported in the Sunday Telegraph that he was launching and funding the Good Business Charter to encourage businesses to improve their behaviour, which was confirmed by Carolyn Fairbairn in a speech at the CBI's annual conference the following day. It was launched on 3 February 2020. A number of notable charities, businesses and public sector organisations have signed up, including Amnesty, Aviva, Brompton Bicycle, Capita, Confederation of British Industry, Deloitte, London City Airport, Oxfam, St. James's Place plc, Trades Union Congress, TSB Bank plc, and the University of York

In January 2020, Richer launched Zero Hours Justice, a campaign designed to highlight the exploitative nature of zero hour contracts and ultimately, to seek a complete ban on them, when unilaterally imposed on workers. It has also fought for humane working practices around zero hours contracts, such as advocating for staff to be put on furlough while on zero hours contracts. It provides legal information and advice through a telephone helpline, email and website. Apart from that, this campaign also empowers people by circulating necessary information regarding zero hour contracts and promoting healthy working environments.

On 29 November 2021, The Fairness Foundation was launched, which Richer had founded to change the terms of the public debate about fairness, and to inspire citizens, the media and decision-makers to create a fairer society. The Foundation focuses on areas such as democracy, education, the environment, health, housing, justice, social security, taxation, wealth and work as some of the core issues that need addressing in order to make society fairer. The editorial board is chaired by Will Hutton.

Books
Richer has written several books, including:

The Richer Way, which talks about starting a business and how to motivate a workforce by getting the best out of people. The Independent described it as "one of the best business books in history"  

The Ethical Capitalist, which discusses the need for a new sense of moral purpose in business and how to make business work better for society. This was a Financial Times book of the month.

Personal life
Richer is married to Rosie, a fashion model. They live near York in North Yorkshire, England.

Richer was baptised into the Anglican faith in 2006 by The Rev Canon Roger Simpson at St Michael Le Belfrey, York and was confirmed later the same year by John Sentamu, Archbishop of York, in his chapel in Bishopthorpe Palace.

In his spare time, Richer plays the drums in the soul/funk/pop group, Ten Millennia, who have supported Shakin' Stevens, The Corrs, Texas, Tony Hadley and Jools Holland [on 13 occasions], including November 30, 2018 at the Royal Albert Hall.

References

External links
Richer Sounds
Audio Partnership
Richer Unsigned
ASB Help
ACTS 435
TaxWatch
Good Business Charter
Zero Hours Justice
The Fairness Foundation

British retail company founders
English businesspeople in retailing
Lieutenants of the Royal Victorian Order
Living people
1959 births
People educated at Clifton College